Taxi is the second studio album by Greek singer-songwriter and record producer Nikos Karvelas, released by Minos in 1983. It is composed entirely of English-language material.

Track listing

External links 
 Official site

1983 albums
Albums produced by Nikos Karvelas
Concept albums
Minos EMI albums
Nikos Karvelas albums